Çobankaya may refer to:

 Çobankaya, Bolu
 Çobankaya, Kargı
 Çobankaya, Şuhut